Enna (Sicilian: Pruvincia di Enna; officially Libero consorzio comunale di Enna) is a province in the autonomous island region of Sicily in Italy. 

It was created in 1927, out of parts of the Provinces of Caltanisetta and Catania. The capital was designated as Enna (then called Castrogiovanni), instead of Piazza Armerina, due to the influence of politician Napoleone Colajanni. Following the suppression of the Sicilian provinces, it was replaced in 2015 by the Free municipal consortium of Enna. Its capital is the city of Enna, located on a mountain and the highest provincial capital in Sicily. Located in the center of the island, it is the only landlocked province in Sicily.

There are 20 comunes (Italian: comuni) in the province , see Comunes of the Province of Enna. The main comunes by population are:

Main sights
 
 Villa Romana del Casale, in Piazza Armerina, a huge ancient Roman "villa", where there are many well preserved Roman mosaics, the most important mosaic system in the Roman world of that time;
 Morgantina, an ancient town that constitutes the most important archeological area in Central Sicily, whose finds are located in many big museums all over the world: Malibu, Los Angeles, California; New York; Musée du Louvre, Paris; and the Archeological Museum of Aidone, the commune in which Morgantina is located.
 Castello di Lombardia, in Enna, the biggest castle of Sicily: it had 20 towers centuries ago, but now it has 6 towers, and among these there is Torre Pisana, a very big tower affording an extensive panoramic vista of the surrounding countryside;
 Duomo of Enna, a  cathedral built in the 13th century;
 Museo Alessi in  Enna, a museum which hosts the exhibitions of the Treseaure of Enna's Our Lady and her crown, made with gold.
 The Cathedral of Piazza Armerina, characterized by a huge green dome.
 Lake Pergusa, in Enna: it has a forest inside a wildlife reserve, where thousands of rare birds can be found.
  The Autodromo di Pergusa,  the most important racing circuit of Southern Italy: it hosted and still hosts  international competitions, such as Formula One, Formula 3000, and the Ferrari Party and other events

Events
In Enna, for Good Friday, there is a procession, and on 2 July is held the Enna's Our Lady feast; Piazza Armerina, on 11, 12 and 13 August, is seat of the Palio dei Normanni, an ancient and traditional feast whose protagonists are the horses.

External links
Official website
 Pictures, history, tourism, hospitality, books, local products, local surnames, transportation in the province of Enna 

 
Enna